Culbertson is an English language patronymic surname of Norman French origin.  Its oldest public record dates to 1066 in Cheshire and Lancashire. People with the name include:

 Anne Virginia Culbertson, American writer
 Brian Culbertson, American smooth jazz musician
 Clarence B. Culbertson, American politician
 Clive Culbertson, founder of The Order of Druids in Ulster, Northern Ireland
 Edgar Culbertson, U.S. Coast Guardsman, Coast Guard Medal Recipient
 Ely Culbertson, American contract bridge player, author and promoter

 Frank L. Culbertson Jr., American astronaut
 Henry N. Culbertson (1860-1943), American farmer and politician

 John Culbertson (economist) (1921 - 2001), American economist
 John J. Culbertson, former 5th Marine Regiment sniper and author of 13 Cent Killers: The 5th Marine Snipers in Vietnam
 John T. Culbertson Jr. (1891-1982), American jurist
 Josephine Culbertson (1898-1956), American bridge player
 Michael Simpson Culbertson, American clergyman and missionary in China 
 Philip Culbertson, Producer and Guitarist in The Damsons
 Rod Culbertson, British actor

 Steve Culbertson, American, President & CEO of Youth Service America
 William Constantine Culbertson, US Congressman from Pennsylvania
 William Culbertson (businessman), American millionaire
 William Culbertson III, American, fifth President of the Moody Bible Institute

See also
 Culberson (disambiguation)

References 

Patronymic surnames